Gbemisola Ruqayyah Saraki  (born 3 May 1965) is a Nigerian politician who has served as the Minister of State for Mines and Steel Development of Nigeria since 6 July 2022. She served earlier as the Minister of State for Transportation from 2019 till she was moved by the President to the Ministry of Mines and Steel Development in 2022. 

A former senator, she was elected to represent the Kwara Central Senatorial District in the year 2003 under the platform of the People's Democratic Party. She was elected into the House of Representatives in 1999 representing Asa/Ilorin West Federal Constituency, Kwara State. She is a sister of former Senate President of Nigeria (8th Assembly), Bukola Saraki.

Early life and education
Saraki was born on 3 May 1965 to Abubakar Olusola Saraki and Florence Morenike Saraki, her father was a leading senator in the Second Nigerian Republic (1979–1983) and father of politics in Kwara State.
Her brother, Abubakar Bukola Saraki was governor of Kwara State, Nigeria  from 29 May 2003 to 29 May 2011 and was the President of the 8th Senate of Nigeria. She attended the University of Sussex in the United Kingdom and earned a bachelor's degree in Economics. She did her national service at the Nigeria Bank for Commerce and Industry, Lagos. She worked for the Societe Generale Bank (Nigeria)  with the post of the Head of Money Markets and later as Head of Domiciliary Accounts.
From 1994 to 1999, she was Executive Director of Ashmount Insurance Brokers, Lagos.

Political career
Saraki was elected as a member of the House of Representatives in 1999 under the umbrella of the All People's Party (APP). 
She ran under the umbrella of the People's Democratic Party, (PDP) for the senate in 2003 and won the seat, representing the Central Senatorial District of Kwara State. She re-contested in 2007 and won again, serving as a Senator of the Federal Republic of Nigeria for eight years (2003–2011). In 2011, she contested in the gubernatorial election of Kwara State under the ACPN party, losing election to  PDP's Abdulfatah Ahmed. As a legislator, she was a member of several committees. At the Senate, Saraki chaired the Senate Committee on National Planning, Poverty Alleviation and Economic Affairs. She also acted as Vice-Chairperson of the Senate Committee on Foreign Affairs.

Saraki was also a returning member of the ECOWAS Parliament. Saraki defected to the All Progressives Congress  (APC) in 2015. In February 2016, Saraki was appointed by President Muhammed Buhari as the Pro Chancellor and Chairperson of the Federal University, Otuoke, Bayelsa State. On 13 February 2017, Saraki was also appointed as one of the 16-member committee to re-negotiate its 2009 agreement with the Academic Staff Union of Universities (ASUU).

On 21 August 2019, President Muhammadu Buhari appointed her Minister of State for Transportation  and on 6 July 2022, she was appointed Minister of State for Mines and Steel Development.

See also 
List of Hausa people

References

Kwara State
1965 births
Living people
Peoples Democratic Party members of the Senate (Nigeria)
Yoruba women in politics
Alumni of the University of Sussex
Nigerian Fula people
Gbemisola
21st-century Nigerian politicians
21st-century Nigerian women politicians